British Bulldog may refer to:

 British Bulldog, an alternative name for the Bulldog
 British Bulldog revolver, a type of revolver popular in the late 19th and early 20th centuries
 British Bulldog (game), a tag-based playground and sporting game
 The British Bulldogs, a professional wrestling tag-team of two British cousins (Davey Boy Smith and Dynamite Kid)
 Davey Boy Smith, the professional wrestler known in singles competition as "The British Bulldog"
 Davey Boy Smith Jr., professional wrestler and son of Davey Boy Smith, also performs under "The British Bulldog" moniker
 The Great Britain national Australian rules football team, nicknamed the "British Bulldogs"

See also
 Old English Bulldog, an extinct breed